John Olav Nilsen & Gjengen (translated as John Olav Nilsen & Company) was a Norwegian rock-pop band from Loddefjord, Bergen, Norway. It was fronted by singer-songwriter and main vocalist John Olav Nilsen (born 20 December 1982). The lyrics are entirely in Norwegian.

History 
Initially, the band played several concerts in Bergen and Western Norway during 2007 and 2008. Their song "Diamanter & Kirsebær" was released on a compilation disc titled Opplett 2008 produced by the label Opplett, founded by Erlend Øye of Kings of Convenience, and featuring music from Bergen-based acts including Fjorden Baby!, Kommode, The New Wine, Razika, Di Kjipe and Lars Vaular. In addition, they opened for Norwegian rock band Fjorden Baby! in a major concert on 18 December 2008.

The band was featured on NRK Urørt broadcast on P3 in 2008, and one of the finalists for best act in Urørt's annual show finishing in third place. In February 2009, they performed at the by:Larm music festival in Oslo. Also in February 2009, they were signed to Norwegian record label Voices Music & Entertainment (also known as VM&E).

The band's debut album was released on 14 September 2009 and well received by critics and selling over 15,000 of the album. During Spellemannprisen equivalent to the Grammys held on 6 March 2010, they won the classic rock award in addition to being nominated for "best newcomer of 2009".

On 7 February 2011, the band released their second album Det nærmeste du kommer followed by a single Vinterkarusellen with Nils Bech in February 2012. In September 2013, Nilsen declared that the band was history.

On 13 February 2015, the band's front man and namesake, John Olav Nilsen, was convicted of violence, theft and possession of amphetamine. Nilsen was sentenced in Bergen District Court to 60 days of prison. . The drug charges was later dropped.

Discography

Albums 
 For Sant Til Å Være Godt (2009) 
 Det Nærmeste Du Kommer (2011) 
 Den Eneste Veien Ut (2012)

Singles 
2009: TI Ganger Tusen
2009: Valiumsvalsen
2009: Hull I Himmelen
2011: Skrekkfilm
2011: Hundeår
2011: Klokkene
2012: Vinterkarusellen
2012: Eurosport 
2012: Nesten Som Eg Lever
2013: Bensinbarn

Awards 
2009: Spellemannprisen in the category Rock, for the album For Sant Til Å Være Godt

References

External links 

John Olav Nilsen & Gjengen - Hull i Himmelen on YouTube

Spellemannprisen winners
Norwegian indie rock groups
Musical groups established in 2006
2006 establishments in Norway
Musical groups from Bergen